In numerical analysis, the Lagrange interpolating polynomial is the unique polynomial of lowest degree that interpolates a given set of data.

The Lagrange polynomial  has degree  and assumes each value at the corresponding node, 

Although named after Joseph-Louis Lagrange, who published it in 1795, the method was first discovered in 1779 by Edward Waring. It is also an easy consequence of a formula published in 1783 by Leonhard Euler.

Uses of Lagrange polynomials include the Newton–Cotes method of numerical integration and Shamir's secret sharing scheme in cryptography.

For equispaced nodes, Lagrange interpolation is susceptible to Runge's phenomenon of large oscillation.

Definition
Using the Kronecker delta this can be written  Each basis polynomial can be explicitly described by the product:

Notice that the numerator  has  roots at the nodes  while the denominator  scales the resulting polynomial so that 

The Lagrange interpolating polynomial for those nodes through the corresponding values  is the linear combination:

Each basis polynomial has degree , so the sum  has degree , and it interpolates the data because 

The interpolating polynomial is unique. Proof: assume the polynomial  of degree  interpolates the data. Then the difference  is zero at  distinct nodes  But the only polynomial of degree  with more than  roots is the constant zero function, so  or

Barycentric form

By factoring  out from the sum, we can write the Lagrange polynomial in the so-called first barycentric form:

For any   because the constant function  is the unique polynomial of degree  interpolating the data  We can thus further simplify the barycentric formula by dividing 

This is called the second form or true form of the barycentric interpolation formula.

Using this formula to evaluate  at one of the nodes  will result in the indeterminate ; computer implementations must replace such results by 

Each Lagrange basis polynomial can also be written in barycentric form:

A perspective from linear algebra

Solving an interpolation problem leads to a problem in linear algebra amounting to inversion of a matrix. By choosing a better basis, the Lagrange basis, we merely get the identity matrix, which is its own inverse: the Lagrange basis automatically inverts the analog of the Vandermonde matrix.

This construction is analogous to the Chinese remainder theorem. Instead of checking for remainders of integers modulo prime numbers, we are checking for remainders of polynomials when divided by linears.

Furthermore, when the order is large, Fast Fourier transformation can be used to solve for the coefficients of the interpolated polynomial.

Example
We wish to interpolate  over the domain  at the three nodes 

 

The node polynomial  is

The barycentric weights are

The Lagrange basis polynomials are

The Lagrange interpolating polynomial is:

In (second) barycentric form,

Notes

The Lagrange form of the interpolation polynomial shows the linear character of polynomial interpolation and the uniqueness of the interpolation polynomial.  Therefore, it is preferred in proofs and theoretical arguments.  Uniqueness can also be seen from the invertibility of the Vandermonde matrix, due to the non-vanishing of the Vandermonde determinant.

But, as can be seen from the construction, each time a node xk changes, all Lagrange basis polynomials have to be recalculated. A better form of the interpolation polynomial for practical (or computational) purposes is the barycentric form of the Lagrange interpolation (see below) or Newton polynomials. 

Lagrange and other interpolation at equally spaced points, as in the example above, yield a polynomial oscillating above and below the true function. This behaviour tends to grow with the number of points, leading to a divergence known as Runge's phenomenon; the problem may be eliminated by choosing interpolation points at Chebyshev nodes.

The Lagrange basis polynomials can be used in numerical integration to derive the Newton–Cotes formulas.

Remainder in Lagrange interpolation formula
When interpolating a given function f by a polynomial of degree  at the nodes  we get the remainder  which can be expressed as

where  is the notation for divided differences. Alternatively, the remainder can be expressed as a contour integral in complex domain as

The remainder can be bound as

Derivation
Clearly,  is zero at nodes. To find  at a point , define a new function  and choose   where  is the constant we are required to determine for a given . By Rolle's theorem,  has  zeroes,  has  zeroes...  has 1 zero, say . Explicitly writing :

The equation can be rearranged as

Since  we have

Derivatives
The th derivative of a Lagrange interpolating polynomial can be written in terms of the derivatives of the basis polynomials,

The first derivative can be found using the product rule:

The second derivative is

The third derivative is

and likewise for higher derivatives.

Finite fields
The Lagrange polynomial can also be computed in finite fields.  This has applications in cryptography, such as in Shamir's Secret Sharing scheme.

See also
Neville's algorithm
Newton form of the interpolation polynomial
Bernstein polynomial
Carlson's theorem
Lebesgue constant (interpolation)
The Chebfun system
Table of Newtonian series
Frobenius covariant
Sylvester's formula
Finite difference coefficient
Hermite interpolation

References

External links

 
 ALGLIB has an implementations in C++ / C# / VBA / Pascal.
 GSL has a polynomial interpolation code in C
 SO has a MATLAB example that demonstrates the algorithm and recreates the first image in this article
 Lagrange Method of Interpolation — Notes, PPT, Mathcad, Mathematica, MATLAB, Maple at Holistic Numerical Methods Institute
Lagrange interpolation polynomial on www.math-linux.com
 

 Dynamic Lagrange interpolation with JSXGraph
 Numerical computing with functions: The Chebfun Project
 Excel Worksheet Function for Bicubic Lagrange Interpolation
 Lagrange polynomials in Python

Interpolation
Polynomials
Articles containing proofs